Peter Davies (18 August 1957 – 10 March 2018) was an Australian cricketer. He played six first-class cricket matches for Victoria between 1981 and 1983.

See also
 List of Victoria first-class cricketers

References

External links
 

1957 births
2018 deaths
Australian cricketers
Victoria cricketers
Cricketers from Melbourne